Huayuan Town is a town and the county seat of Huayuan County in Hunan, China.

The town is located in the northeast of the county, it is bordered by Changle Township to the west and Baojing County, Baojing County to the north, Biancheng Town to the west, Longtan Town, Shilan Town, Malichang Town and Shuanglong Town to the south. The seat is at Jianshezhonglu Rd.().

References

Divisions of Huayuan County
County seats in Hunan
Towns of Xiangxi Tujia and Miao Autonomous Prefecture